Nikos Tsoukalos (born 23 March 1992) is a Greek professional footballer who plays as a winger for Super League club Lamia.

References

1992 births
Living people
Greek footballers
Super League Greece players
Football League (Greece) players
Gamma Ethniki players
Tyrnavos 2005 F.C. players
Anagennisi Karditsa F.C. players
PAS Lamia 1964 players
Association football forwards
Footballers from Lamia (city)